Emiko Okagawa (born 26 December 1964) is a former professional tennis player from Japan. She was also known as Emiko Sakaguchi.

Biography
Born in Tokyo, Okagawa reached a best singles ranking on the professional tour of 120 in the world.

Between 1983 and 1987 she played in four Federation Cup ties for Japan. In her debut tie she helped Japan progress through to the World Group second round, winning both a singles and doubles rubber in Japan's 2-1 win over Denmark.

Okagawa was a semi-finalist at the 1987 Singapore Women's Open and made the third round of the 1988 Australian Open.

In 1993, her final year on tour, she became Emiko Sakaguchi after getting married.

ITF finals

Singles (3–2)

Doubles (2–0)

See also
List of Japan Fed Cup team representatives

References

External links
 
 
 

1964 births
Living people
Japanese female tennis players
Sportspeople from Tokyo
People from Suginami